Dialypetalum is a genus of plants endemic to Madagascar. It differs from other Lobelioideae in having regular (actinomorphic) flowers with virtually free petals, and in being dioecious. It contains the following species, accepted as of July 2014:

Dialypetalum compactum Zahlbr.
Dialypetalum floribundum Benth. in G.Bentham & J.D.Hooker
Dialypetalum humbertianum E.Wimm. in H.G.A.Engler 
Dialypetalum × hybridum E.Wimm. in H.G.A.Engler   (D. compactum × D. floribundum)
Dialypetalum montanum E.Wimm. in H.G.A.Engler 
Dialypetalum stenopetalum E.Wimm. in H.G.A.Engler

References

External links

Madagascar catalogue, Living Plant image, Dialypetalum floribundum
photo of herbarium specimen at Missouri Botanical Garden, collected in Madagascar in 1990, Dialypetalum montanum

Lobelioideae
Campanulaceae genera
Endemic flora of Madagascar